The incremental inductance rule, attributed to Harold Alden Wheeler by Gupta and others is a formula used to compute skin effect resistance and internal inductance in parallel transmission lines when the frequency is high enough that the skin effect is fully developed.  Wheeler's concept is that the internal inductance of a conductor is the difference between the computed external inductance and the external inductance computed with all the conductive surfaces receded by one half of the skin depth.  

Linternal = Lexternal(conductors receded) - Lexternal(conductors not receded).

Skin effect resistance is assumed to be equal to the reactance of the internal inductance.

Rskin = ωLinternal.

Gupta gives a general equation with partial derivatives replacing the difference of inductance.

where 
 is taken to mean the differential change in inductance as surface m is receded in the nm direction.
 is the surface resistivity of surface m.
 magnetic permeability of conductive material at surface m.
 skin depth of conductive material at surface m.
 unit normal vector at surface m.

Wadell and Gupta state that the thickness and corner radius of the conductors should be large with respect to the skin depth.  Garg further states that the thickness of the conductors must be at least four times the skin depth.  Garg states that the calculation is unchanged if the dielectric is taken to be air and that  where  the characteristic impedance and  velocity of propagation = the speed of light.  Paul, 2007,
At very high frequency, the current crowds into the corners of the conductor.

Example

In the top figure, if 
and 
then the internal inductance is
 where  is the velocity of propagation in the dielectric.
and the skin effect resistance is

Notes

References

Signal cables
Telecommunications engineering
Transmission lines
Distributed element circuits